Robert Jurmain is a professor emeritus of anthropology at San Jose State University.

Jurmain holds an A.B. in anthropology from UCLA and a Ph.D. in Biological Anthropology from Harvard. He joined the San Jose State faculty in 1975, and taught there until his retirement in 2004.

He is the author or coauthor of three textbooks on physical anthropology. In addition, his monograph Stories from the Skeleton: Behavioral Reconstruction in Human Osteology (Gordon and Breach, 1999) discusses the problem of determining what a person did, based only on markers in the person's bones such as fractures or evidence of osteoarthritis. Jurmain demonstrates that much past inference of this type has been based on flawed or circular reasoning, and instead argues that a more rigorous approach to this sort of research is called for.

References

Living people
Year of birth missing (living people)
American anthropologists
University of California, Los Angeles alumni
Harvard University alumni
San Jose State University faculty